Irina Andreyevna Krivonogova (born 3 May 2000) is a Russian swimmer.

She competed in the 2018 European Aquatics Championships, winning silver medal in both the 4×200m women's freestyle relay and the 4×200m mixed freestyle relay.

References

2000 births
Living people
Russian female swimmers
Russian female freestyle swimmers
Swimmers at the 2015 European Games
European Aquatics Championships medalists in swimming
European Games medalists in swimming
European Games gold medalists for Russia
Universiade medalists in swimming
Universiade bronze medalists for Russia
Medalists at the 2019 Summer Universiade